Kodhiyar or Kothiar is a village in Sitamarhi district, Bihar state, India.  It is situated one kilometer east from the river Bagmati four kilometers south of Dhang Railway Station, and adjacent to the village of Akhta.  It is located in the Suppi subdistrict and Akhta Uttar panchayat.

References

Villages in Sitamarhi district